Aquinas College is an independent Catholic secondary school, located in the Gold Coast suburb of Southport in Queensland, Australia.

Aquinas College has a current enrolment of 1,200 students from Year 7-12. Founded in 1964 by the Congregation of Christian Brothers, the college is owned by the parish and is administered and staffed by Brisbane Catholic Education. Aquinas College has four houses, Chisholm, Edmund Rice, McAuley and Romero.

Notable alumni 
 Jesinta Campbell, TV personality/model
 Meaghan Scanlon lawyer, politician, Member for Gaven

See also 

 catholic education in Australia
 Lists of schools in Queensland

References

External links 

Educational institutions established in 1964
Schools on the Gold Coast, Queensland
Private schools in Queensland
Former Congregation of Christian Brothers schools in Australia
1964 establishments in Australia
Catholic schools in Queensland
Roman Catholic Archdiocese of Brisbane